Ammo! Okato Tareekhu is a 2000 Indian Telugu-language black comedy film written and directed by E. V. V. Satyanarayana, and produced by K. Chandrasekhar under A. A. Arts. The film features an ensemble cast including Srikanth, Raasi, Suresh, Mumtaj, Surya, Prema and L. B. Sriram. The music was composed by Vandemataram Srinivas. The film deals with problems in the middle class families.

Cast

Srikanth as Pattabhi, Gayatri's husband
Raasi as Gayatri, Govind Rao's second daughter
Suresh as Kiran "G. K.", Govind Rao's son
Mumtaj as Ganga, Kiran's wife
Surya as Sagar, Dhana Lakshmi's husband
Prema as Dhana Lakshmi, Govind Rao's eldest daughter
L. B. Sriram as Govind Rao
Aalapati Lakshmi as Sowbhagyam
Kota Srinivasa Rao as Anjaneyulu, Govind Rao's father
Lahari as Parvati, Govind Rao's youngest daughter
Tanikella Bharani as Gireesham
Chalapathi Rao as Devudu
Dubbing Janaki as Devudu's mother
Brahmanandam
M. S. Narayana
Mallikarjuna Rao as Kranti
Namala Moorti
Ali as Jamadagni
Raja Ravindra as Kiran's friend
Tirupathi Prakash as Kiran's friend
Bandla Ganesh as Kranti's assistant
Devadas Kanakala as Judge
Kadambari Kiran as cab driver
Sana
Banda Jyoti

Soundtrack

References

External links

2000 films
2000s Telugu-language films
Indian drama films
Films about poverty in India
Films directed by E. V. V. Satyanarayana
2000 drama films